Shahzada Rehmatullah Khan Durrani was a Pakistan Movement activist born on 10 October 1919 in the Sadozai dynasty of Durrani, the ethnic Pashtun Sadozai tribe, section of the Popalzai sub clan of Durrani Abdali Pashtun tribe in British India, Quetta.

Early life
Shahzada Rehamatullah Khan Sadozai was approximately one year old when his father Shahzada Habibullah Khan Sadozai died then his grand father Shahzada Mohammad Abdul Rahim Durrani and his uncle Sardar Abdul Majeed Khan Durrani became the guardians of Shahzada Rehamatullah Khan Sadozai . some years later as first formal educated male of family he soon assumed the control of his father's business “Khan Brothers” Reg firm since 1900. His good friends was Khan Abdul Ghafoor Khan Durrani the Popalzai Durranies Chief in Balochistan & Qazi Muhammad Essa a well known leader  of All-India Muslim League in Balochistan were backbone in the Pakistan Independent Movement aside by Founder of Pakistan from Balochistan Province. He made a strong career by serving as a social welfare volunteer, politician and one of the great Pashtun tribal sadozai chief. He was sponsor of an Adventurers Association and football club in Quetta. His father-in-law Khan Mohammad Sadeeq Khan Ghalzai was from Loralai and Peer Zainudin Algillani, Meer Ghulam Nabi Marri (Shaheed), Haji Mohammad Hashim Khan Ghalzai, Haji Mirza Khan Peichi of Loralai were his reliable friends.

Political career
Rehmatullah Khan Durrani was an activist with the  Muslim Students Federation Balochistan. Khan Abdul Ghafoor Khan Durrani, leader of the Muslim League, introduced him with the Quaid-e-Azam. He performed major role in the Pakistan independence movement aside with Qazi Muhammad Essa and Khan Abdul Ghafoor Khan Durrani, head of All-India Muslim League in Balochistan especially in Quetta as a loyalist Muslim league. He was a friend of Mohammad Ali Jinnah, the founder of Pakistan. 15 June 1948 Shahzada Rehmatullah Khan Sadozai had a meeting with Mohammad Ali Jinnah and Fathima Jinnah on the eve of presentation of civic address in Town Hall Quetta and discussed various matters.

As volunteer 
Durrani helped the victims of the 1935 Quetta earthquake and was the chief of the Sadozai tribe in Balochistan. He founded the Sadozai Qaumi Welfare Organization. He died from cancer on 29 November 1992 at the age of 73.

References

External links

Pashtun people
People from Quetta
1919 births
1992 deaths
Leaders of the Pakistan Movement
People from British India
Pakistan Movement activists from Balochistan